The Cathedral of St. James is an Episcopal cathedral in South Bend, Indiana, United States. It is the seat of the Diocese of Northern Indiana.  The cathedral church and the adjoining parish hall were placed on the National Register of Historic Places in 1985.

History

St. James parish was established in 1868 and was the first Episcopal congregation in the city.  The present church building was designed by the architectural firm of Austin & Parker in the Gothic Revival style.  It was completed in 1894.  The parish hall was completed in 1920.

Initially, the parish was part of the Diocese of Indiana and became a part of the Diocese of Michigan City when Indiana was split by the 1898 General Convention.  Trinity Church in Michigan City was chosen as the diocesan cathedral at the first diocesan convention on April 25, 1899.  It served that purpose until November 4, 1917, when it ceased being a cathedral. The name of the diocese was changed to the Diocese of Northern Indiana on May 20, 1919.  St. James Church became the diocesan cathedral on January 30, 1957.

Former mayor of South Bend Pete Buttigieg has been a parishioner at St. James since 2010. On July 16, 2018 he married his husband Chasten Glezman at the cathedral.

See also
List of the Episcopal cathedrals of the United States
List of cathedrals in the United States

References

External links

Cathedral website
Diocese of Northern Indiana website

Religious organizations established in 1868
Churches completed in 1894
19th-century Episcopal church buildings
Gothic Revival church buildings in Indiana
Episcopal church buildings in Indiana
James, Saint, South Bend
Churches in South Bend, Indiana
National Register of Historic Places in St. Joseph County, Indiana
Churches on the National Register of Historic Places in Indiana
Churches in St. Joseph County, Indiana
Tourist attractions in South Bend, Indiana